The 2015 Hong Kong Sevens was the 40th edition of the Hong Kong Sevens and the sixth tournament of the 2014–15 Sevens World Series.

Format
As in the last tournament, there will be a main draw with the fifteen World Series core teams and one invited team, and a qualifying tournament featuring twelve teams, the winner of which will be given core status in the next series.

Teams
The teams confirmed for both the World Series and World Series Qualifier events at the 2015 Hong Kong Sevens are listed below:

Main draw

World Series Qualifier

Match officials
The match officials for the 2015 Wellington Sevens are as follows:

  Mike Adamson (Scotland)
  Federico Anselmi (Argentina)
  Ben Crouse (South Africa)
  Richard Kelly (New Zealand)
  James McPhail (Netherlands)
  Taku Otsuki (Japan)
 
  Alex Ruiz (France)

Main draw
The draw was announced on 16 February. All times UTC +08:00.

Pool stage

Pool A

Pool B

Pool C

Pool D

Knockout stage

Shield

Bowl

Plate

Cup

World Series Qualifier
The draw was announced on 16 February.

Pool stage

Pool E

Pool F

Pool G

Ranking matches

References

External links

Tournament Official Site

2015
rugby union
2014–15 IRB Sevens World Series
2015 in Asian rugby union
March 2015 sports events in China